Johnnie Newton Autry (born March 16, 1953) is an American politician. He was elected to the North Carolina House of Representatives in 2016. A Democrat, he serves the 100th district. He previously served on the Charlotte City Council.

Electoral history

2020

2018

2016

References

Living people
1953 births
People from Fayetteville, North Carolina
People from Charlotte, North Carolina
Politicians from Charlotte, North Carolina
21st-century American politicians
Democratic Party members of the North Carolina House of Representatives